The 1920 Bowling Green Normals football team was an American football team that represented Bowling Green State Normal School (later Bowling Green State University) as an independent during the 1920 college football season. In its second season of intercollegiate football, Bowling Green compiled a 1–4 record and was outscored by a total of 138 to 41. Walter Jean was the coach, and Charles Clucas was the team captain.

Schedule

References

Bowling Green
Bowling Green Falcons football seasons
Bowling Green Normals football